JPN is the third studio album (fourth overall) by Japanese girl group Perfume, released on November 30, 2011, by Tokuma Japan Communications, nearly two and a half years after their second studio album Triangle. The album sold a total of 268,414 after two weeks of release, making it the 24th best-selling album of 2011 according to Oricon.

JPN is the group's last release under Tokuma Japan Communications as the group moved to Universal Music Japan (as announced February 28, 2012) for their future releases. JPN was released worldwide on March 6, 2012, to over 50 countries via iTunes.

Background
The album was announced at Perfume's official website on September 5, 2011, along with a dance contest, their nineteenth single "Spice" and their third nationwide arena tour "Perfume Third Tour: JPN" starting in January 2012. It was released in two different versions; as a CD-only version and in a limited edition CD+DVD featuring promotional videos and commercial spots.

The B-side track of "Nee" ("FAKE IT") was not included in this album but two years later in "Perfume Global Compilation "LOVE THE WORLD"" album.

Composition 
The album includes all of the group's past four singles: "Fushizen na Girl/Natural ni Koishite", "Voice", "Nee", and "Laser Beam/Kasuka na Kaori". It also includes the singles' corresponding B-side songs. The only song out of all the singles that did not make it to this album was "Fake it" from the single Nee.

The group's nineteenth single, "Spice", serves as the album's lead single. It was released on November 2, 2011. A special version of its B-side song, "Glitter", is also included in the album.

Five of the other tracks are brand-new songs, including "My Color", "Toki no Hari" (時の針), and "Have a Stroll".

"Fushizen na Girl" was slightly edited from the original single version for this album, however, it is uncredited.

Commercial performance
The album debuted at number 1 in the Oricon Weekly Albums Chart with 227,000 copies sold on its first week of release, their highest debut week sales than their previous albums in their career to date. This also made them the second female Japanese group to achieve three consecutive number one albums, a feat first achieved twelve years ago by veteran pop group Speed. The album sold a total of 268,000 after two weeks of release, making it the 24th best-selling album of 2011.

In South Korea, the album debuted at number thirty-nine in the Gaon Monthly International Albums, selling 358 copies.

Track listing

Chart positions

Oricon charts

Other charts

Certifications

Accolades
 Spin's 20 Best Pop Albums of 2011 - ranked 14th

Release history

References 

2011 albums
Japanese-language albums
Tokuma Shoten albums
Perfume (Japanese band) albums
Albums produced by Yasutaka Nakata